The Korea Petroleum Association, or KPA, is a South Korean oil, petroleum and lubricant association. It is headquartered in Yeouido-dong, Yeongdeungpo-gu, Seoul, South Korea.

Members
SK Energy
GS Caltex
S-Oil
Hyundai Oilbank

See also
Oil
Refinery
Petroleum industry
Lubricant
Chemical
Economy of South Korea

External links
 

Oil companies of South Korea
Chemical companies of South Korea
Energy business associations